The 62nd Filipino Academy of Movie Arts and Sciences Awards Night was held at the Solaire Resort and Casino in Parañaque on July 13, 2014. KC Concepcion won Best Actress and ER Ejercito won Best Actor. Erik Matti won Best Director for his film On the Job as well as Best Picture.

Awards

Major Awards
Winners are listed first and highlighted with boldface.

Special Awards
German Moreno Youth Achievement Award
Julia Barretto
Ken Chan
Janine Gutierrez
Hiro Peralta
Jerome Ponce
James Reid
FAMAS Grand Award
ER Ejercito
Fernando Poe Jr. Memorial Award
Piolo Pascual
Art Padua Memorial Award
Boy Abunda
Dr. Jose Perez Memorial Award
Mario Dumaual
Exemplary Award for Public Service
Engineer Felizardo Jun Sevilla Jr.
Excellence Award in Criminal Justice Pao Jail Visitation Team/Legal, Medical Dental, Optical Mission
Persida Acosta
Presidential Award
Tzu Chi Foundation
Male Celebrity Star of the Night
Gerald Anderson
Female Celebrity Star of the Night
KC Concepcion
Male Movie Star of the Night
Gerald Anderson
Female Movie Star of the Night
Valerie Concepcion

References

External links
FAMAS Awards 

FAMAS Award
FAM
FAM